Lobate debris aprons (LDAs) are geological features on Mars, first seen by the Viking Orbiters, consisting of piles of rock debris below cliffs. These features have a convex topography and a gentle slope from cliffs or escarpments, which suggest flow away from the steep source cliff.  In addition, lobate debris aprons can show surface lineations as do rock glaciers on the Earth.

The Mars Reconnaissance Orbiter's Shallow Radar gave a strong reflection from the top and base of LDAs, meaning that pure water ice made up the bulk of the formation (between the two reflections).  This is evidence that the LDAs in Hellas Planitia are glaciers covered with a thin layer of rocks.  In addition, radar studies in Deuteronilus Mensae show that all lobate debris aprons examined in that region contain ice.

The experiments of the Phoenix lander and the studies of the Mars Odyssey from orbit show that frozen water exists just under the surface of Mars in the far north and south (high latitudes).  Most of the ice was deposited as snow when the climate was different.  The discovery of water ice in LDAs demonstrates that water is found at even lower latitudes.  Future colonists on Mars will be able to tap into these ice deposits, instead of having to travel to much higher latitudes.  Another major advantage of LDAs over other sources of Martian water is that they can easily be detected and mapped from orbit.  Lobate debris aprons are shown below from the Phlegra Montes which are at a latitude of 38.2 degrees north.  The Phoenix lander set down at about 68 degrees north latitude, so the discovery of water ice in LDAs greatly expands the range of water easily available on Mars.  It is far easier to land a spaceship near the equator of Mars, so the closer water is available to the equator, the better it will be for colonists.

Lineated floor deposits 

The floors of some channels show ridges and grooves that seem to flow around obstacles; these features are called lineated floor deposits or lineated valley fill (LVF).  Like lobate debris aprons, they are believed to be ice-rich.  Some glaciers on the Earth show such features.

It has been suggested that lineated floor deposits began as LDAs. By tracing the paths of the curved ridges characteristic of LDAs, researchers have come to believe that they straighten out to form the ridges of LVF.  Both lineated floor deposits and lobate debris aprons often display a strange surface formation called brain terrain because it looks like the surface of the human brain.

Reull Vallis, pictured below, displays these deposits.  Sometimes the lineated floor deposits show a chevron pattern, which is further evidence of movement.  The picture below taken with HiRISE of Reull Vallis shows these patterns.

Recent observations 
Recent analyses of the Nereidum Montes (~35°- 45°S, ~300° - 330°E), and Phlegra Montes (NNE - SSW, between latitudes 30° - 52°N) mountain ranges of Mars have revealed terrains rich in viscous flow features (VFFs), a cyro-geomorphological group of which lobate debris aprons are a sub-class. In a 2014 study, 11,000 VFFs have been recorded between 40° and 60° in northern and southern latitudes, with a 2020 study identifying approximately 3,348 VFFs in the Nereidum Montes range. These LDAs were more extensive and older VFF features (hundreds of Ma) in the range, with the vast majority located in impact craters and surrounding massifs.

Water-ice to lithic ratios of 9:1 were recorded for LDAs by the Mars Reconnaissance Orbiter (MRO), with Berman’s 2020 study presenting Nereidum Montes as possibly containing more water-ice rich LDAs, than other locations in the mid-latitude band. Late Amazonian glaciation may have occurred in the mid-latitudes due to water-ice emplacement from higher latitudes. This glaciation may have occurred during high obliquity periods in Mars past. Some of these LDAs are overlain with another class of viscous ice flows that is smaller, and younger (tens of Ma) called glacial-like flows (GLFs). Some 320 of these superposed GLFs (SGLFs) have been found, implying successive glaciation periods.

The datasets utilized in these studies included MRO Context Camera (CTX; ~5–6 m/pixel), High-Resolution Imaging Science Experiment (HiRISE) (~25 cm/pixel) images, MRO Shallow Radar (SHARAD), 128 pixel/degree (~463 m/pixel) Mars Global Surveyor (MGS), Mars Orbiter Laser Altimeter (MOLA), Digital Elevation Modelling (DEM), 100 m/pixel THEMIS Day and Night IR mosaics, and the GIS-based (ESRI ArcGIS Desktop) software.

Gallery

See also

References

External links 
 Martian Ice - Jim Secosky - 16th Annual International Mars Society Convention
 Jeffrey Plaut - Subsurface Ice - 21st Annual International Mars Society Convention

Geology of Mars
Surface features of Mars